Scoparia scripta is a species of moth in the family Crambidae. It is endemic in New Zealand.

Taxonomy

This species was described by Alfred Philpott in 1918. However the placement of this species within the genus Scoparia is in doubt. As a result, this species has also been referred to as Scoparia (s.l.) scripta.

Description

The wingspan is 29–32 mm. The forewings are pale ochreous, sprinkled with fuscous and suffused with white on the costal half. There is a thick black basal streak from the costa and the first line is whitish, margined with fuscous posteriorly. The second line is whitish and preceded by a series of black dots. There is a series of roundish black dots on the termen. The hindwings are pale whitish-ochreous. Adults have been recorded on wing in January.

Host species
The caterpillars of this moth feed on Epilobium species.

References

Moths described in 1918
Moths of New Zealand
Scorparia
Endemic fauna of New Zealand
Endemic moths of New Zealand